Monte Cassino Chronicle may refer to:

Chronicon monasterii Casinensis, chronicle of Monte Cassino from c. 529 until 1138, written by:
Leo of Ostia (1046–c.1116)
Peter the Deacon (fl. 1115–1131)

Historia belli sacri, chronicle of the First Crusade and its aftermath from 1095 until 1131